The  is a river in Nara and Wakayama Prefecture in Japan. It is called  in Nara. It is 136 km long and has a watershed of 1,660 km².

The river flows from Mount Ōdaigahara to the west. It pours into Kii Channel at Wakayama city.

Geography
The boundary between Nara prefecture and Mie prefecture is designated as the source. 
The rainy season helped to create an Alluvial plain. The course of the river often changes, with frequent floods.

Railroad
The JR West Wakayama Line partly runs in parallel with the river.

History
Abundant water was useful for human settlement.

It was an area where the Koyasan, Kokawa and Mitsui temples were strong; centralized rule was impossible, until Nobunaga Oda suppressed the Saika Ikki.

The novelist Sawako Ariyoshi titled one of her books after the river.

Rivers of Nara Prefecture
Rivers of Wakayama Prefecture
Rivers of Japan